Rapture is the third studio album by Australian pop band, The Mavis's, which was released in March 2003 by their record label, Festival Mushroom Records. It was produced by Kalju Tonuma, who had also worked on their previous two studio albums. The album's lead single, "Coming Home" (July 2000), peaked at No. 72 on the ARIA Singles Chart. The second single, "Happiness", was released in February 2001, which reached the top 100 on the ARIA Singles Chart and No. 9 on the related ARIA Alternative Singles Chart.

The album had been delayed from its originally proposed release date of July 2001 due to problems between the band and the label. According to Matt Atlee of Australian Music Scrapbook website it was an "amicable split", however Christie Eliezer of Music & Media Business News reported that "Despite what both sides say, the Mavis's split from Festival Mushroom Records and the canning of the July-due Rapture album was far from amicable." In July to August 2001 the group toured Australia and performed tracks from the album, before disbanding in December.

Five months prior to the studio album's appearance, Festival Mushroom Records issued a compilation album, Throwing Little Stones... The Best of (20 October 2002), which included tracks from Rapture. At subsequent reunion concerts by The Mavis's, in February 2013 and December 2014, they played material from all three of their studio albums.

Track listing

Personnel 

The Mavis's members
 Josh Alexander – bass guitar
 Nick Gill – guitar
 Becky Thomas – vocals
 Matt Thomas – vocals, guitar, keyboards
 Andrea Vendy – drums, percussion

Recording credits
 Mastering – Howie Weinberg
 Producer – Kalju Tonuma
 Mixing – Mark Saunders

References 

2003 albums
The Mavis's albums